The men's lightweight (60 kg/118.8 lbs) Thai-Boxing division at the W.A.K.O. European Championships 2006 in Skopje was the fourth lightest of the male Thai-Boxing tournaments and involved nine fighters.  Each of the matches was three rounds of two minutes each and were fought under Thai-Boxing rules.

As there were not enough men for a tournament fit for sixteen, seven of the fighters received a bye into the quarter finals.  The tournament gold medallist was Pashik Tatoyan from Russia who defeated Bahtiyar Iskanderzade from Azerbaijan in the final via a unanimous decision victory.  Semi finalists Gor Shavelyan from Russia and Aleksandar Jankovic from Serbia received bronze medals for their efforts.

Results

Key

See also
List of WAKO Amateur European Championships
List of WAKO Amateur World Championships
List of male kickboxers

References

External links
 WAKO World Association of Kickboxing Organizations Official Site

W.A.K.O. European Championships 2006 (Skopje)